The Truth About Youth is a 1930 American pre-Code drama with songs produced and distributed by First National Pictures, a subsidiary of Warner Bros. Directed by William A. Seiter, the film stars Loretta Young, Conway Tearle, David Manners and Myrna Loy. It was based on the 1900 play When We Were Twenty-One, written by Henry V. Esmond.

Plot
Richard Carewe has raised Richard Dane since childhood. Dane was the son of Carewe's close friend and Carewe promised to care for his son before the friend died. Carewe plans for Dane to marry Phyllis Ericson, the daughter of his housekeeper. Phyllis, however, has no interest in Dane and is in love with Carewe. The film begins on the day of Dane's twenty-first birthday. Carewe is planning a surprise birthday party. Dane never shows up as he has gone to a nightclub to see his new girlfriend, Kara, a notorious gold-digger who sings and dances at the nightclub under the name of The Firefly. Dane returns home in the early hours of the morning drunk and carelessly drops a note from Kara on his way to his room. Early the next day, the housekeeper finds the note Dane had dropped and shows it to her daughter Phyllis, who shows the note to Carewe. As the note is addressed to "Richard", Carewe thinks quickly and pretends the note is his. Phyllis is upset as she is in love with Carewe.

When confronted with the note by Carewe, Dane gets upset and plans to elope with Kara. He goes and proposes marriage to Kara, who accepts because she thinks he is rich. After the wedding, when Kara discovers he is poor, she tells him that she never wants to see him again. Carewe, not knowing that Kara has already married Dane, offers her five thousand dollars to pretend to be his own lover in public. When Phyllis arrives at the nightclub, she almost cries when she witnesses Kara's attentions to Carewe. She leaves the nightclub. Later on, Dane arrives and is heartbroken to find Kara has sold herself a day after their wedding. Dane goes home and confesses everything to Phyllis. She realizing the truth, confesses her love for Carewe when he returns. They embrace as Carewe confesses his love for her also.

Cast
 Loretta Young as Phyllis Ericson
 Conway Tearle as Richard Carewe
 David Manners as Richard Dane 'The Imp' 
 Myrna Loy as Kara
 J. Farrell MacDonald as Colonel Graham 
 Myrtle Stedman as Mrs. Ericson  
 Harry Stubbs as Horace Palmer
 Yola d'Avril as Babette - Kara's Maid
 William Irving as Jim Greene 
 Joseph E. Bernard as Headwaiter 
 Ray Hallor as Hal - Dane's Pal
 William Bailey as Jim - Kara's Boyfriend

Songs
 "Playing Around" (Sung by Myrna Loy)
 "I Have to Have You" (Sung by Myrna Loy)

Box Office
According to Warner Bros records the film earned $231,000 domestically and $50,000 foreign.

Preservation
The film survives intact at the Library of Congress and has been broadcast on both television and cable (e.g., AAP). On home video it is available from Warner Archive Collection sharing space with another Loretta Young film, The Right of Way.

References

External links
 
 
 
 

1930 films
American black-and-white films
1930s English-language films
Films directed by William A. Seiter
First National Pictures films
American films based on plays
American drama films
1930 drama films
1930s American films